Betta akarensis, the Akar betta, is a species of gourami endemic to south-east Sarawak, and whose species name akar was so named after where it was originally found in the river Sungai Akar.  This species is a mouthbrooder, and grows to a length of  SL. According to Linke, they "live predominantly in mineral-poor, slightly acid water enriched with humic substances".

References

akarensis
Taxa named by Charles Tate Regan
Fish described in 1910